Events from the year 1725 in Canada.

Incumbents
French Monarch: Louis XV
British and Irish Monarch: George I

Governors
Governor General of New France: Philippe de Rigaud Vaudreuil then Charles de la Boische, Marquis de Beauharnois
Colonial Governor of Louisiana: Pierre Dugué de Boisbriand
Governor of Nova Scotia: John Doucett
Governor of Placentia: Samuel Gledhill

Events
 August 27 - French ship Chameau sank near Louisbourg.
 Claude-Thomas Dupuy was appointed intendant of New France.
 Peter the Great sends Vitus Bering to explore the North Pacific.
 1725-1729 - First Arctic expedition of Vitas Bering.

Births
Juan José Pérez Hernández, naval officer and explorer (died 1775)

Deaths

Historical documents
"No method can be so effectual" - Another call for Six Nations to come into war on side of Massachusetts against Indigenous people

Massachusetts leader's update on war alleges Father Rasles refused "to give or take quarter" before his death

Long letter of Fr. Rasles mentions champions, fires, scalps, wounded, plunder, ransom, and "a very great inclination for peace at Boston"

Long letter of Gov. Vaudreuil mentions injustice, unreasonableness, pretension, confusion and trouble, sacrifice, threatenings, and cruelty

Murderous kidnappers take New England women and children to Canada

Île-Royale governor tells Nova Scotia councillors that Penobscot and Saint John River Indigenous people are "inured to war"

Indigenous people in Nova Scotia "have shewed some inclinations of peace," but lieutenant governor wants to avoid separate peace

Nova Scotia commissioner to Boston peace talks with Indigenous people is directed to encourage their intermarriage with British

Promising peace, four Indigenous delegates sign treaty stating British "jurisdiction and dominion" over Nova Scotia

New France laments loss of naval ship with all hands, death of Gov. Vaudreuil, and "much regretted" departure of Intendant Bégon

Nova Scotia is "most commodious Colony for the fishing trade," with "greatest salmon fishery in the world"

Summary of Nova Scotia events includes inhabitants in 1725 taking oath "to the Government" (by extortion, they say later)

Île-Royale governor assures Nova Scotia lieutenant governor that no one supplies arms to Indigenous people (Note: "savage" used)

Lt. Gov. Armstrong reports evidence of clandestine trade and secret introduction of "Missionary Priest" from Île-Royale

Armstrong to assemble force (including Indigenous from New England) "to humble the vilanous french inhabitants as well as Indians"

Book on war with "Eastern Indians" offers "a Narrative of Tragical Incursions perpetrated by Bloody Pagans[...]" (Note: racial stereotypes)

Scores of Newfoundland taverns serve fishers on credit to point latter "have nothing left to carry them home" at season's end

Newfoundlander's complaint of Placentia commander's assault on himself, wife and daughter, plus extortion (with supporting depositions)

Scheme to put 100 blockhouses at back of colonies from Nova Scotia to South Carolina to prevent Indigenous attack

Photograph: 1725 Kahnawake fortification wall

References

 
Canada
25